Delta Coronae Borealis, Latinized from δ Coronae Borealis, is a variable star in the constellation Corona Borealis. Its apparent magnitude varies regularly between apparent magnitude 4.57 and 4.69, and it is around 170 light-years distant.

δ Coronae Borealis is a yellow giant star of spectral type G3.5III that is around 2.4 times as massive as the Sun and has swollen to 7.4 times its radius. It has a surface temperature of 5180 K. For most of its existence, Delta Coronae Borealis was a blue-white main sequence star of spectral type B before it ran out of hydrogen fuel in its core. Its luminosity and spectrum suggest it has just crossed the Hertzsprung gap, having finished burning core hydrogen and just begun burning hydrogen in its shell. It is a strong source of X-rays due to its hot corona.

In 1989, it was noticed that the brightness of δ Coronae Borealis is not constant.  Approximately every 45 days, its brightness changes sinusoidally between 4.57 and 4.69, too small to be noticed without close monitoring.  The evolutionary state of the star and its probably rotation period mean that the variations may be due to its rotation with different parts of the surface having spots or different temperatures.  This would make it an RS Canum Venaticorum variable.  The period has since been refined to 59 days and this is now accepted as the star's rotation period.

References

Corona Borealis
G-type giants
Coronae Borealis, Delta
Coronae Borealis, 10
077512
141714
5889
Durchmusterung objects